Bombus erzurumensis is a species of bumblebee found in Turkey (north-eastern Anatolia) and northern Iran.

Description 
The thorax is whitish with a black band between the wings. The two first terga (abdominal segments) are white, followed by a black band; the rest of the abdomen is red. Variation in the pattern is considerable, but the form B. erzurumensis f. oezbeki (earlier considered a separate species, B. oezbeki) has white fur on the face and the corbiculae (pollen basket) is covered with red hairs.

Ecology 
It collects nectar and pollen from flowering plants, for example, Cephalaria, Campanula, Jurinea, and Nepeta species.

References 

Bumblebees
Insects described in 1990
Hymenoptera of Asia
Insects of Asia